"Love Is Wicked" is the second single from Brick & Lace's debut album of the same title. The single was recorded over the Diwali Riddim and was released to iTunes on May 22, 2007. It is also featured on the Bratz Motion Picture Soundtrack. It is a slightly modified version of a song of the same name that Brick & Lace recorded sometime in 2004. It sold over 120,000 copies in France during the summer of 2008. The song was released in France on September 8, 2008.

Music video
The music video for the song has been released. It shows the duo dancing, and singing on a summer day. The song has been featured on The Sims 2. The video was uploaded to YouTube on June 17, 2009 and it currently holds over 109 million views.

Track listings
 CD single
 "Love Is Wicked" — 3:45
 "Love Is Wicked" (MF remix) — 3:48

 CD maxi
 "Love Is Wicked" (radio edit) — 3:43
 "Love Is Wicked" (alternate version) — 3:45
 "Love Is Wicked" (instrumental) — 3:45
 "Love Is Wicked" (a cappella) — 3:45

Personnel
 Written by Nailah Thorbourne, Nyanda Thorbourne, Steven "Lenky" Marsden and Tasha Thorbourne
 Engineered by Eric Weaver and Seth Waldman
 Mixed by Dave "Hard Drive" Pensado
 Photography by Meeno
 Produced by Abraham Laboriel Jr, Mateo Laboriel, Ron Fair and Steven "Lenky" Marsden
 Made in the EU

Charts

Peak positions

Year-end charts

References

External links
Brick and Lace - Love Is Wicked Music Video at KOvideo.net

2007 singles
Brick & Lace songs
Song recordings produced by Ron Fair
Songs written by Steven "Lenky" Marsden
2004 songs
Geffen Records singles